This list of notable waterfalls of the world is sorted by continent, then country, then province, state or territory.

There is no standard way to measure the height or width of a waterfall. No ranking of waterfalls should be assumed because of the heights or widths provided in the list. Many numbers are estimated and measurements may be imprecise. See additional lists of waterfalls by height, flow rate and type.

Africa

Angola 

Burundi 
 Kagera Falls
 Rusumo Falls

Central African Republic 
 Boali Falls

Chad 
 Gauthiot Falls

Democratic Republic of the Congo 

 Boyoma Falls – formerly known as Stanley Falls; highest flow rate in the world
 Inga Falls
 Livingstone Falls

Ethiopia 
 Blue Nile Falls

Ghana 

 Boti Falls
 Kintampo Falls
 Tagbo Falls
 Wli Falls
 Akaa falls

Guinea 
 Tinkisso Falls

Kenya 
 Karuru Falls
 Thomson's Falls

Lesotho 

Libya 
 Derna Falls

Madagascar 
 Andriamamovoka Falls
 Mahamanina Falls
 Mandraka Falls
 Rianbavy Falls
 Riandahy Falls

Mali 
 Gouina Falls

Morocco 

Namibia 
 Epupa Falls

Nigeria 
 Awhum Falls
 Erin-Ijesha Falls
 Agbokim Waterfalls
 Gurara Falls
 Matsirga Falls
 Owu Falls

Rwanda 
 Rusumo Falls

Somalia 

 Lamadaya Falls

South Africa

KwaZulu-Natal 

 Howick Falls
 Ncandu Falls

Mpumalanga 
 Berlin Falls
 Lisbon Falls
 Lone Creek Falls
 Mac-Mac Falls

Northern Cape 
 Augrabies Falls

Tanzania 

 Materuni Waterfalls
 Rusumo Falls

Uganda 
 Murchison Falls
 Sipi Falls

Zambia 

 Chavuma Falls
 Chisimba Falls
 Kabwelume Falls
 Kalambo Falls – see Tanzania above
 Kundalila Falls
 Lumangwe Falls
 Mambilima Falls
 Mumbuluma Falls
 Mutumuna Falls
 Ngonye Falls
 Ntumbachushi Falls
 Nyambwezi Falls

Zimbabwe 
 Victoria Falls – see Zambia above

Asia

Bangladesh 
 Hum Hum Falls
 Jadipai Falls
 Madhabkunda Falls
 Nafa-khum Falls

Cambodia 
 Ka Choung Falls
 Kbal Chhay Falls

China 

 Ban Gioc–Detian Falls – Karst Hills, Daxin County, Chongzuo Prefecture, Guangxi Province; Asia's largest transnational waterfall, shared between China and Vietnam
 Pearl Shoal Falls – Jiuzhaigou, Sichuan
Dalongqiu Waterfall – Zhejiang province;

East Timor 

 Bandeira Falls – near Atsabe
 Berloi Falls – Fatisi

Hong Kong 
 Waterfall Bay – near Aberdeen, Hong Kong Island; historically known for replenishing British merchant ships with its water

India 

 Agaya Gangai Falls
 Aruvikkuzhy Falls
 Athirappilly Falls
 Barkana Falls
 Catherine Falls
 Chachai Falls
 Chitrakote Falls – also called Chitrakoot or Chitrakot Falls
 Chunchanakatte Falls
 Courtallam Falls – also called Kutralam Falls
 Dhuandhar Falls
 Dudhsagar Falls
 Duduma Falls
 Godchinamalaki Falls
 Gokak Falls
 Hebbe Falls
 Hogenakkal Falls
 Irupu Falls – also called Iruppu Falls
 Jog Falls – also called Joga or Gerosoppa Falls
 Jonha Falls
 Khandadhar Falls – Kendujhar district
 Khandadhar Falls – Sundergarh district
 Kiliyur Falls
 Kunchikal Falls – , tallest waterfall in India
 Kutladampatti Falls
 Lodh Falls – also called Burhaghat Falls
 Magod Falls
 Meenmutty Falls – Thiruvananthapuram district
 Meenmutty Falls – Wayanad district
 Nohkalikai Falls
 Sathodi Falls
 Thalaiyar Falls – also called Rat Tail Falls
 Thoseghar Falls – Satara district
 Unchalli Falls – also called Lushington Falls
 Vajrai Falls
 Vajrapoha Falls
 Vazhachal Falls

Indonesia 

 Gitgit Falls
 Jaksa Falls
 Sedudo Falls
 Sipisopiso Falls
 Moramo Waterfalls

Iran 
 Laton Waterfall – , tallest waterfall in Iran
 Margoon Falls
 Bisheh Waterfall
 Shirabad Waterfall
 Gerit Waterfall
 Nojian Waterfall

Japan 

 Kegon Falls – ; infamous for suicides
 Nachi Falls – 
 Nunobiki Falls –  in four cascades, of great cultural significance, considered a meisho, or "famous site"

Kyrgyzstan 
 Abshir Ata Falls
 Barskoon Falls

Laos 

 Khone Phapheng Falls – southeast Asia's biggest waterfall by volume

Malaysia 

 Berkelah Falls
 Cemerung Falls
 Chiling Falls
 Gabai Falls
 Kanching Falls
 Kota Tinggi Falls
 Mahua Falls
 Maliau Falls
 Takob Akob Falls

Nepal 
 Davis Falls
 Hyatung Falls

North Korea 
 Ullim Falls

Pakistan 

 Dhani Falls
 Jarogo Falls
 Manthokha Falls
 Pir Ghaib Falls
 Sajikot Falls

Philippines 

 Abaga Falls
 Dodiongan Falls
 Hinulugang Taktak Falls
 Kaytitinga Falls
 Limunsudan Falls
 Maria Cristina Falls
 Matang Tubig Falls
 Pagsanjan Falls 
 Pinandagatan Falls
 Tinago Falls
 Tinuy-an Falls
 Tudaya Falls

Russia (Siberia) 
 Ilya Muromets Falls – 
 Kinzelyuk Falls – 
 Talnikovy Falls –

Singapore 
Cloud Forest – ; an artificial waterfall
Rain Vortex – ; reputedly, the tallest indoor artificial waterfall in the world

South Korea 

 Cheonjeyeon Falls
 Cheonjiyeon Falls
 Jeongbang Falls

Sri Lanka 

 Bomburu Ella Falls – located near Welimada
 Devon Falls – located near Talawakelle
 St. Clair's Falls – one of the widest waterfalls in Sri Lanka

Thailand 
 Mae Surin Falls
 Phu Fa Falls
 Thi Lo Su Falls
 Wachirathan Falls

Taiwan 

 Golden Falls
 Lingjiao Falls
 Penglai Falls
 Wufengqi Falls
 Wulai Falls
 Yuntan Falls

Turkey 

 Düden Falls – Antalya
 Göksu Falls – Sivas
 Gürlevik Falls – Erzincan
 Kurşunlu Falls – Antalya
 Manavgat Falls in Antalya
 Tortum Falls – Erzurum

Vietnam 

Europe

Austria 

 Krimml Falls – , highest waterfall in Austria

Bosnia and Herzegovina 
 Bliha Falls – 
 Kravice Falls – 
 Pliva Falls – 
 Skakavac Falls – Perućica, 

 Skakavac Falls – Sarajevo, 
 Štrbački buk Falls –

Bulgaria 

 Babsko Praskalo – 
 Boyana Waterfall – Vitosha Mountain
 Emen Waterfall
 Etropole Waterfall Varovitets – 
 Karlovsko Praskalo – 
 Krushuna Falls – 
 Popinolashki waterfall – 
 Raysko Praskalo – , highest waterfall in the Balkans
 Skakavitsa Waterfall – , Rila Mountain
 Vratsa waterfalls
 Skaklia (not constant) – 
 Borov Kamak –

Croatia 
 Veliki slap (Large Waterfall) – , highest waterfall in Croatia
 Skradinski Buk – Krka river

Czechia 

 Labský vodopád (Elbe waterfall) - 35 m (115 ft) followed by 200 m (656 ft) of rapids
 Mumlavský vodopád (Mumlava waterfall) - 10 m (32 ft) fall with highest flow rate in Czechia
 Pančavský vodopád (Pančava waterfall) - 148 m (486 ft) highest in Czechia
 Pudlavský vodopád (Pudlava waterfall) - 122 m (400 ft)
 Rudické propadání (Rudice sinkhole) - 86 m (282 ft) highest sinkhole waterfall in Czechia

Denmark 
 Døndalen – , highest waterfall in Denmark

Estonia 
 Jägala Falls
 Keila Falls
 Narva Cascades
 Valaste Falls – , highest waterfall in Estonia

Faroe Islands 
 Bøsdalafossur – 
 Fossá – , highest waterfall in the Faroe Islands

Finland 

 Hepoköngäs – , highest waterfall in Finland
 Kitsiputous
 Pitsusköngäs

France 

 Gavarnie Falls – , highest waterfall in mainland France
 Trou de Fer Falls – Réunion Island

Germany 
 All Saints Falls – , Oppenau, Baden-Württemberg
 Röthbach Falls – , Berchtesgaden, highest waterfall in Germany
 Sankenbach Falls – , Baiersbronn
 Triberg Falls – , River Gutach in Triberg

Greece 
 Edessa Falls – , Macedonia

Hungary 
 Lillafüred Falls – , artificial

Iceland 

 Aldeyjarfoss
 Barnafoss
 Dettifoss
 Fjallfoss
 Gjáin
 Gljúfrafoss
 Glymur
 Goðafoss
 Gullfoss
 Hafragilsfoss
 Háifoss
 Hengifoss
 Hraunfossar
 Ófærufoss
 Selfoss
 Seljalandsfoss
 Skógafoss
 Svartifoss

Ireland 
 Assaroe Falls
 Powerscourt Falls – , highest waterfall in Ireland
 Sruth in Aghaidh an Aird
 Torc Falls

Italy 

 Cascata delle Marmore – , tallest man-made waterfall in the world
 Cascate del Rio Verde
 Cascate del Serio – , highest waterfall in Italy
 Cascata del Toce
 Cascate del Varone
 Cascate Nardis

Kosovo 
 Mirusha Waterfalls 
 White Drin Waterfall

Latvia 

 Abavas rumba

North Macedonia 

 Bogomila Falls
 Duf Falls
 Kolešino Falls
 Korab Falls
 Koprišnica Falls
 Smolare Falls – ; tallest waterfall in North Macedonia

Norway 

 Espelandsfossen
 Kjelfossen – 
 Kjeragfossen – 
 Langfoss
 Låtefossen
 Månafossen
 Mardalsfossen
 Mongefossen – 
 Ramnefjellsfossen – ; also known as Utigardsfossen or Utigordsfossen
 Rjukanfossen
 Sarpsfossen – one of the greatest flow rates of any waterfall in Europe
 Skrikjofossen
 Stalheimsfossen
 Steinsdalsfossen – a path goes behind the waterfall
 Tyssestrengene
 Vettisfossen
 Vinnufossen – ; the highest waterfall in Europe
 Vøringfossen

Poland 

 Siklawa – High Tatras – , highest waterfall in Poland
 Siklawica – Tatra Mountains – 
 Wodospad Kamieńczyka – Sudetes – 
 Wodospad Wilczki – Eastern Sudetes –

Portugal 
 Pego do Inferno – Tavira, Algarve
 Penedo Furado – Vila de Rei, Castelo Branco
 Pulo do Lobo –

Azores 
 Cascata da Ribeira Grande –  falls is the tallest waterfall at Fajãzinha
 Cascata do Poço do Bacalhau – ; Fajã Grande

Madeira 

 Risco Falls – 
 25 Fontes Falls – ; Madeira

Romania 
 Bigăr Falls
 Vălul Miresei Falls

Russia 
 Kivach Falls – ; Karelia
 Polikarya Falls – ; Sochi National Park

Serbia 

 Kaluđerski Skokovi Falls – ; Stara Planina; highest waterfall in Serbia
 Kopren Falls – ; Stara Planina
 Pilj Falls – ; Stara Planina

Slovakia 

 Kmeťov vodopád – , High Tatras
 Šútovský vodopád – , Lesser Fatra
  – , High Tatras
  – , High Tatras
  – , Slovak Central Mountains
  – , Western Tatras
 , High Tatras
  – , High Tatras
  – , Low Tatras

Slovenia 
 Boka – , tallest in Slovenia
 Javornik Falls
 Peričnik Falls
 Rinka Falls

Sweden 
 Fettjeåfallet – 
 Hällingsåfallet – 
 Hallamölla – 
 Njupeskär – 
 Stora Sjöfallet National Park – ; once one of the most powerful in Europe; however, after construction of the Suorva Dam, the flow rate decreased from an average of 160 m3/s to 6 m3/s
 Styggforsen – 
 Västanåfallet –

Switzerland 

 Engstligen Falls – Adelboden
 Reichenbach Falls – Meiringen
 Rhine Falls – Schaffhausen – most powerful falls in Europe
 Staubbach Fall – Lauterbrunnen
 Trümmelbach Falls – Lauterbrunnen

Ukraine 

 Djur-Djur Falls –  
 Dzhurynskyi Falls – 
 Maniava Falls – 
 Uchan-su Falls – , highest waterfall in Ukraine
 Zhenetskyi Huk Falls –

United Kingdom

England 

 Aira Force – ; Ullswater in the Lake District
 Aysgarth Falls – Wensleydale in the Yorkshire Dales
 Canonteign Falls – ; an artificial waterfall in Devon
 Cauldron Snout – ; one of England's highest; upstream from High Force
 Cautley Spout – ; highest waterfall in England; Yorkshire Dales National Park
 East Gill Force – Swaledale in the Yorkshire Dales
 Falling Foss – ; near Whitby, North Yorkshire
 Gaping Gill – ; highest unbroken waterfall in England, with water falling from the surface into a cavern
 Hardraw Force – ; highest unbroken waterfall above ground, in Wensleydale in the Yorkshire Dales
 High Force – ; largest volume of water falling over an unbroken drop; one of the more popular waterfalls in England
 Kisdon Force – Swaledale in the Yorkshire Dales
 Low Force – downstream from High Force
 Mallyan Spout – Goathland in the North Yorkshire Moors
 Moss Force – Newlands Valley in the Lake District
 Wain Wath Force – Swaledale in the Yorkshire Dales
 White Lady Falls – ; falls located in a narrow gorge

Northern Ireland 
 Glenariff Forest Park

Scotland 

 Corra Linn, the Falls of Clyde – 
 Eas a' Chual Aluinn –  in a single drop; highest waterfall in the United Kingdom
 Falls of Foyers – 
 Falls of Glomach – 
 Steall Falls –  in a single drop; the second highest single-drop waterfall in the United Kingdom

Wales 

 Aber Falls
 Aberdulais Falls – powers Europe's largest hydro-electric water wheel
 Devil's Appendix – , highest waterfall in Wales
 Henrhyd Falls
 Pistyll Rhaeadr
 Pistyll y Llyn
 Swallow Falls

North America

Belize 

 Big Rock Falls – 150 ft. Mountain Pine Ridge Forest Reserve, Cayo District
 Thousand Foot Falls – 1,600 ft. (488 m) Thousand Foot Falls National Park, Cayo District

Canada

Alberta 

 Athabasca Falls – Jasper National Park
 Bow Falls – Banff National Park
 Bow Glacier Falls – Banff National Park
 Crescent Falls – on the David Thompson Highway
 Maligne Canyon Falls – Jasper National Park
 Panther Falls – Banff National Park
 Sunwapta Falls – Jasper National Park

British Columbia 

 Alexander Falls – Callaghan Valley, near Whistler
 Brandywine Falls – near Whistler
 Bridal Veil Falls – also called Bridal Falls; near Rosedale
 Canim Falls – Wells Gray Provincial Park
 Chatterbox Falls – Princess Louisa Marine Provincial Park
 Dawson Falls – Wells Gray Provincial Park
 Della Falls – Strathcona Provincial Park
 Emperor Falls – Mount Robson Provincial Park
 Helmcken Falls – Wells Gray Provincial Park
 Hunlen Falls – Tweedsmuir South Provincial Park
 Keyhole Falls – near Pemberton
 Kinuseo Falls – near Tumbler Ridge
 Mahood Falls – Wells Gray Provincial Park
 Moul Falls – Wells Gray Provincial Park
 Nairn Falls – near Pemberton
 Shannon Falls – near Squamish
 Spahats Creek Falls – Wells Gray Provincial Park
 Takakkaw Falls – Yoho National Park
 Wapta Falls – Yoho National Park

Newfoundland and Labrador 
 Churchill Falls – on Churchill River, Labrador
 Pissing Mare Falls – Gros Morne National Park

Northwest Territories 

 Alexandra Falls – on Hay River
 Virginia Falls – on South Nahanni River in Nahanni National Park

Nunavut 
 Wilberforce Falls – Hood River

Ontario 

 Albion Falls – near Hamilton
 Helen Falls – Lady Evelyn River
 Horseshoe Falls – part of Niagara Falls, highest flow rate in North America including the American Falls
 Inglis Falls – Owen Sound
 Kakabeka Falls – near Thunder Bay
 Tew's Falls – Hamilton

Quebec 
 Sainte-Anne Falls – Canyon Sainte-Anne, near Quebec City
 Montmorency Falls – near Quebec City

Costa Rica 

 La Fortuna Falls
 La Paz Falls
 Volio Falls

Greenland 
 Qorlortorsuaq Falls

Guadeloupe 
 Carbet Falls

Haiti 
 Saut-Mathurine Falls

Jamaica 
 Dunn's River Falls – St. Ann
 Mayfield Falls – Westmoreland

Mexico 

 Agua Azul
 Basaseachic Falls
 Cascada de Texolo
 Cola de Caballo
 Piedra Volada

Saint Lucia 
 Sault Falls

United States

Alabama 

 DeSoto Falls – 
 Grace's High Falls – , highest in Alabama, Little River Canyon National Preserve
 Little River Falls – 
 Noccalula Falls – , Gadsden

Alaska 

 Brooks Falls – Katmai National Park and Preserve
 Nugget Falls – also known as Nugget Creek Falls or Mendenhall Glacier Falls, near Juneau

Arizona 

 Grand Falls – , Little Colorado River
 Havasu Falls – 
 Mooney Falls –

Arkansas 
 Hemmed-In-Hollow Falls –  sheer

California 

 Bonita Falls –  while flowing
 Bridalveil Fall –  sheer when flowing
 Burney Falls – , spring-fed, 4 m³/s (140 ft³/s) constant flow rate
 Chilnualna Falls – 
 Darwin Falls – , split over two sections and the tallest waterfall in Death Valley National Park
 Feather Falls – 
 Illilouette Fall – 
 McWay Falls – , flowing year-round
 Ribbon Fall –  when flowing
 Silver Strand Falls –  when flowing
 Three Chute Falls –  on Tenaya Creek, flows highly variable but perennial
 Vernal Fall – ; on Merced River just downstream of Nevada Fall

Colorado 

 Bridal Veil Falls – Telluride; 
 Fish Creek Falls – 
 Seven Falls –

Connecticut 
Dean's Ravine Falls
Great Falls – Housatonic River
Kent Falls
Roaring Brook Falls

Georgia 

 Amicalola Falls – , highest waterfall in Georgia
 Anna Ruby Falls –  on the Curtis Creek side
 Cascade Falls –  cascade with 3 drops, the tallest of which is 
 Cochrans Falls –  cascade
 Dick's Creek Falls –  sheer drop over a granite mound into the Chattooga River
 Dukes Creek Falls – 
 Estatoah Falls – several hundred feet, exact height not known
 Holcomb Creek Falls – 
 Minnehaha Falls – 
 Toccoa Falls –  sheer drop

Florida 
 Falling Water Falls -  waterfall, the highest in the state

Hawaii 
 (listed after Australia in the Oceania section below)

Idaho 

 Lower Mesa Falls
 Moyie Falls
 Shoshone Falls – 
 Twin Falls
 Upper Mesa Falls

Indiana 
 Cataract Falls
 Williamsport Falls

Kentucky 

 Cumberland Falls –  drop, home to moonbows when the moon is full, flowing year-round
 Seventy Six Falls –  drop in Clinton County
 Yahoo Falls – , tallest plunge waterfall in Kentucky

Louisiana 
 Lake Peigneur Drilling Disaster –  drop (all below sea-level) flowed for 3 days in 1980 due to an oil rig drilling into a salt mine

Maine 
 Angel Falls
 Katahdin Falls – , tallest waterfall in Maine
 Moxie Falls
 Smalls Falls

Maryland 

 Cunningham Falls – , cascading waterfall
 Great Falls – , cascading waterfall
 Muddy Creek Falls – , the highest free falling waterfall in Maryland

Massachusetts 
 Bash Bish Falls – ; a series of cascades with the final one being split into twin falls dropping  over boulders to a pool below

Michigan 

See also 
 Bond Falls –  cascades on the Ontonagon River
 Bridalveil Falls –  slide into Lake Superior, in Pictured Rocks National Lakeshore
 Laughing Whitefish Falls – 
 Munising Falls –  sheer drop in Pictured Rocks National Lakeshore

Minnesota 

 Gooseberry Falls – North Shore of Lake Superior
 Saint Anthony Falls – the only waterfall on the Mississippi River, covered by dams in the 19th century
 Vermillion Falls – Hastings
 Wolf Creek Falls – Banning State Park

Missouri 
 Marvel Cave – , subterranean waterfall
 Mina Sauk Falls – , highest waterfall in Missouri

Montana 

 Bird Woman Falls – ; in Glacier National Park
 Big Falls – ; highest of the Great Falls of the Missouri River
 Weeping Wall – falls onto Going-to-the-Sun Road in Glacier National Park

Nebraska 
 Smith Falls – , highest waterfall in Nebraska

New Hampshire 
 Amoskeag Falls – , on the Merrimack River
 Arethusa Falls – , on Bemis Brook
 Diana's Baths – , on Lucy Brook

New Jersey 

 Buttermilk Falls -  drop; Delaware Water Gap National Recreation Area, Walpack Township
 Great Falls –  drop; Passaic River, Paterson

New Mexico 
 Jemez Falls
 Sitting Bull Falls

New York 

 American Falls –  drop, part of Niagara Falls; highest flow rate in North America, including the Canadian Horseshoe Falls
 Barberville Falls –  drop, in the town of Poestenkill in Rensselaer County
 Bouck's Falls – , in the town of Fulton in Schoharie County
 Bridal Veil Falls –  drop, part of Niagara Falls
 Buttermilk Falls – Buttermilk Falls State Park
 Chittenango Falls – , in Madison County
 Cohoes Falls –  drop, Cohoes, along the Mohawk River
 Eternal Flame Falls –  cascade in Chestnut Ridge Park in Erie County; a small grotto at the waterfall's base emits natural gas, which can be lit to produce a flame
 High Falls – , downtown Rochester
 Indian Chimney Falls –  drop, at Indian Chimney Farm in Tompkins County
 Ithaca Falls –  cascade, on Fall Creek in Ithaca
 Lucifer Falls –  in Robert H. Treman State Park
 Pixley Falls – ; Pixley Falls State Park in Oneida County
 Salmon River Falls –  waterfall; Oswego County
 Stony Kill Falls – , Ulster County
 Taughannock Falls –  single, vertical drop, flowing year-round
 Trenton Falls – Trenton in Oneida County
 Upper, Middle, and Lower Falls – a series of waterfalls on the Genesee River in Letchworth State Park
 VerKeerderkill Falls –  sheer drop

North Carolina 

See also 

 Batson Creek Falls –  waterfall that meets Connestee Falls in Transylvania County
 Bridal Veil Falls – ; DuPont State Forest
 Connestee Falls –  tiered cascade that meets Batson Creek Falls in Transylvania County
 Corbin Creek Falls –  series of cascades
 Cullasaja Falls –  falls in Macon County
 Douglas Falls –  plunging falls
 Dry Falls –  sheer drop over an overhanging bluff, allowing visitors to walk behind the falls
 Eastatoe Falls –  cascading falls located on private property near Rosman
 Glassmine Falls –  ephemeral sliding waterfall viewable from the Blue Ridge Parkway in Buncombe County
 Hickory Nut Falls –  horsetail waterfall at Chimney Rock State Park
 High Falls –  drop; DuPont State Forest
 High Shoals Falls – , at South Mountains State Park
 Linville Falls –  drop over several steps, culminating in a  drop
 Looking Glass Falls –  waterfall near Brevard in Transylvania County
 Mingo Falls –  just outside Great Smoky Mountains National Park
 Rainbow Falls –  cascade on the Horsepasture River, Jackson County
 Rainbow Falls –  waterfall in Rutherford County
 Setrock Creek Falls –  in the Pisgah National Forest; height disputed
 Sliding Rock –  slide used as a natural water slide, near Brevard in Transylvania County
 Tory's Falls – 
 Triple Falls –  drop in three steps
 Upper Whitewater Falls –  cascade

Ohio 
 Brandywine Falls – ; Cuyahoga Valley National Park, Northfield
 Cuyahoga Falls – namesake of the city of Cuyahoga Falls

Oklahoma 
 Turner Falls – ; in multiple steps; in the Arbuckle Mountains

Oregon 

 Double Falls – 
 Toketee Falls –  in two steps, the latter of which is over columnar basalt
 Watson Falls –  sheer

Pennsylvania 
 Dingmans Falls – , Dingmans Falls Visitor Center, Delaware Water Gap National Recreation Area
 Fulmer Falls – , at George W. Childs Recreation Site
 Raymondskill Falls –  Delaware Water Gap National Recreation Area
 Silverthread Falls – , Dingmans Falls Visitor Center, Delaware Water Gap National Recreation Area
 Bushkill Falls - , Bushkill Falls

Rhode Island 
 Pawtucket Falls

South Carolina 
 Isaqueena Falls –  cascade, near Walhalla, South Carolina
 Kings Creek Falls –  drop, near the Chattooga River
 Raven Cliff Falls –  drop, Caesars Head State Park
 Whitewater Falls –  "lower" cascade, Oconee County (the larger, "upper" falls are in North Carolina)

South Dakota 

 Sioux Falls – namesake of the city of Sioux Falls

Tennessee 
 Burgess Falls – , Burgess Falls State Park
 Fall Creek Falls – , Fall Creek Falls State Park, highest plunge waterfall east of the Mississippi River
 Ozone Falls – , Ozone Falls State Natural Area
 Rockhouse Falls – , near Spencer
 Ruby Falls – , near Chattanooga

Texas 
 Pedernales Falls State Park

Utah 

Virginia 
 Crabtree Falls – , cascading waterfall with a  drop; tallest waterfall and highest single drop east of the Mississippi River
 Great Falls

Washington 

 Angeline Falls – 
 Berdeen Falls – 
 Blum Basin Falls – 
 Bridal Veil Falls – 
 Colonial Creek Falls – ; the tallest waterfall in the contiguous United States
 Comet Falls – 
 Depot Creek Falls – 
 Green Lake Falls – 
 Langfield Falls – 
 Mazama Falls – 
 Palouse Falls – 
 Pearl Falls – 
 Rainbow Falls – 
 Rainy Lake Falls – 
 Seahpo Peak Falls – about 
 Snoqualmie Falls – 
 Spokane Falls – ; among the largest urban waterfalls in the United States, flowing year-round
 Sulphide Creek Falls  –

West Virginia 

 Blackwater Falls –  sheer drop from Canaan Valley into rugged Blackwater Canyon
 Elakala Falls – Blackwater Canyon

Wisconsin 
 Big Manitou Falls – , Douglas County, highest in Wisconsin
 Grandfather Falls – , highest waterfall on the Wisconsin River
 Superior Falls –  on the Montreal River into Lake Superior

Wyoming 

 Waterfalls of Yellowstone National Park, including:
 Colonnade Falls
 Gibbon Falls
 Kepler Cascades
 Osprey Falls
 Silver Cord Cascade – ; the tallest waterfall in Yellowstone
 Terraced Falls
 Tower Fall
 Union Falls
 Virginia Cascades

Oceania

Australia

New South Wales 

 Apsley Falls
 Belmore Falls
 Carrington Falls
 Ebor Falls
 Ellenborough Falls – , one of the highest in Australia
 Fitzroy Falls
 Tin Mine Falls – estimated  including many segments above main drop; possibly the longest, highest in Australia
 Wentworth Falls

 Wollomombi Falls – , second or third highest in Australia

Northern Territory 

 Florence Falls – Aboriginal name is Karrimurra
 Gunlom Falls – formerly Waterfall Creek Falls
 Jim Jim Falls – Aboriginal name is Barrkmalam
 Tjaynera Falls
 Tolmer Falls
 Twin Falls – Aboriginal name is Gungkurdul
 Wangi Falls

Queensland 

 Barron Falls
 Bilbrough Falls
 Blencoe Falls
 Bloomfield Falls
 Browns Falls
 Clamshell Falls
 Coomera Falls
 Daggs Falls
 Davies Creek Falls
 Dinner Falls
 Herbert River Falls
 Josephine Falls
 Kearneys Falls
 Leichhardt Falls
 Malanda Falls
 Millaa Millaa Falls
 Millstream Falls
 Milmilgee Falls
 Morans Falls
 Murray Falls
 Purling Brook Falls
 Queen Mary Falls
 Simpson Falls
 Stoney Creek Falls
 Teviot Falls
 Tinaroo Falls
 Tully Falls
 Wallaman Falls –  over multiple drops with a  single drop; first or second highest in Australia after Tin Mine Falls
 Whites Falls
 Wongalee Falls
 Yarrbilgong Falls

South Australia 
 First Falls in Waterfall Gully – 25m

Tasmania 

 Adamsons Falls
 Delaneys Falls
 Dip Falls
 Guide Falls
 Horseshoe Falls
 Lady Barron Falls
 Liffey Falls
 Montezuma Falls
 Nelson Falls
 Pelverata Falls
 Russell Falls
 Slippery Falls

Victoria 

 Hopetoun Falls
 Nigretta Falls
 Silverband Falls – Grampians National Park
 Steavenson Falls
 Triplet Falls – Great Otway National Park
 Wannon Falls

French Polynesia 
 Fautaua Falls

Hawaiian Islands 

 Akaka Falls –  drop, Hawaiʻi (hereafter meaning the Big Island)
 Hanakapiai Falls –  drop, Kauai
 Hiilawe Falls –  drop, Waipio Valley, Hawaiʻi
 Kahiwa Falls –  drop, Molokai
 Makahiku Falls –  drop, Maui
 Manawaiopuna Falls –  drop, Kauai
 Manoa Falls –  drop, Oahu
 Oloʻupena Falls –  drop, Molokaʻi north shore; highest waterfall in the U.S. and 4th highest waterfall in the world
 'Opaeka'a Falls –  drop, Kauaʻi east shore
 Pu'uka'oku Falls –  drop, Molokaʻi; 8th highest waterfall in the world
 Rainbow Falls-  drop, Hawaiʻi
 Waihīlau Falls –  drop, Hawaiʻi
 Wailua Falls –  drop, Kauaʻi east shore

New Zealand 

 Āniwaniwa Falls (Rainbow Falls)
 Bridal Veil Falls –  plunge waterfall along the Pakoka River, Waikato
 Huka Falls
 Humboldt Falls
 Kitekite Falls –  3-tiered waterfall near Auckland
 Lady Alice Falls –  horsetail in Doubtful Sound
 Madonna Falls
 Mokau Falls
 Mount Damper Falls
 Owharoa Falls
 Purakaunui Falls
 Rainbow Falls (Waianiwaniwa)
 Sutherland Falls – one of the highest waterfalls in New Zealand, at 
 Tarawera Falls
 Wairere Falls – highest in the North Island at 
 Whangārei Falls

South America

Argentina 
 Iguazu Falls – Spanish: Cataratas del Iguazú; also spelled Iguazú, Iguassu, Iguaçu; Puerto Iguazú, Misiones Province; largest waterfall system in the world; highest flow rate in South America

Brazil 
 Guaíra Falls – Portuguese: Salto das Sete Quedas do Guaíra; Sete Quedas, on the Brazil–Paraguay border
 Iguazu Falls – Portuguese: Cataratas do Iguaçu; Foz do Iguaçu, Paraná; highest flow rate in South America
 Waterfall Park – Portuguese: Parque da Cascata; Sete Lagoas, Minas Gerais

Chile 

 Huilo-Huilo Falls
 Laja Falls – Spanish: Salto del Laja
 Petrohué Falls – Spanish: Saltos del Petrohué

Colombia 
 Tequendamita Falls

Guyana 
 Kaieteur Falls
 King Edward VIII Falls

Paraguay 
 Guaíra Falls – Spanish: Saltos del Guairá; Sete Quedas, on the Brazil-Paraguay border
 Monday Falls – Spanish: Saltos del Monday; along the Monday River

Peru 

 Gocta Falls – Spanish: Catarata del Gocta
 Yumbilla Falls

Venezuela 
 Angel Falls – ; Spanish: Salto Ángel; the highest waterfall in the world
 Cuquenan Falls – Spanish: Salto Kukenan
 Llovizna Falls
 Pará Falls
 Yutaje Falls

See also 

 List of waterfalls by flow rate
 List of waterfalls by height
 List of waterfalls by type

References

External links 

 World waterfall database

 
Waterfalls
Waterfalls